The 1976–77 SK Rapid Wien season was the 79th season in club history.

Squad

Squad and statistics

Squad statistics

Fixtures and results

League

Cup

Cup Winners' Cup

References

1976-77 Rapid Wien Season
Rapid